Hugo Vandermersch (born 5 May 1999) is a French professional footballer who plays as a right back for the club SM Caen.

Career
On 23 July 2019, Vandermersch signed his first professional contract with Stade Malherbe Caen. Vandermersch made his professional debut with Caen in a 1–1 Ligue 2 tie with Niort on 23 August 2019.

References

External links
 
 SM Caen Profile
 LFP Profile

1999 births
Living people
Sportspeople from Pas-de-Calais
French footballers
Footballers from Hauts-de-France
Association football fullbacks
Ligue 2 players
Championnat National 3 players
Stade Malherbe Caen players